George Mcheche Masaju was the Attorney General of Tanzania until February 1, 2018. He was appointed by President Jakaya Kikwete on 3 January 2015 and he continued to be the Attorney General in Magufuli's cabinet.

Early life and career
Before joining the Attorney General's Chambers in 2009 as Deputy AG, he served as a legal adviser to the President.

Masaju also serves as the Board Chairman of the Law School of Tanzania.

Attorney General
He was sworn in as Attorney General on 5 January 2015 at the State House and reappointed to that position on 5 November 2015.

References

External links
 
 Swearing in ceremony of AG Masuja

Living people
Attorneys General of Tanzania
Tanzanian MPs 2010–2015
Tanzanian MPs 2015–2020
Year of birth missing (living people)